Lapeirousia pyramidalis is a species of geophyte in the genus Lapeirousia. It is endemic to the Cape Provinces of South Africa. It is also known as the Pyramid Kabong.

Distribution 
Lapeirousia pyramidalis subsp. pyramidalis is found in the Northern Cape and Western Cape . Lapeirousia pyramidalis subsp. regalis is found in a small area in the Western Cape.

Subspecies 
There are 2 infraspecific named subspecies of pyramidalis:

 Lapeirousia pyramidalis subsp. pyramidalis (Lam.) Goldblatt - known as the pale pyramid kabong
 Lapeirousia pyramidalis subsp. regalis  Goldblatt & J.C.Manning - known as the purple pyramid kabong

Conservation status 
Lapeirousia pyramidalis is classified as Least Concern.

Gallery

References

External links 
 
 

Endemic flora of South Africa
Flora of South Africa
Flora of the Cape Provinces
Iridaceae